Sunset Ridge is a neighborhood in Victorville, in the Victor Valley region of the Mojave Desert, within San Bernardino County, California.

Geography
The neighborhood is located in southern Victorville, between Interstate 15 and U.S. Route 395, and is northwest of Hesperia. 

The average temperature in summer is about 90°F degrees, and in winter is about 40°F degrees. The average snowfall is at least six inches.

See also

References

Victorville, California
Neighborhoods in San Bernardino County, California
Victor Valley